EndSerenading is the second studio album by Mineral, released on August 25, 1998, after the band had broken up.

The album was noted for its overall softer and quieter sound in comparison to the band's former album, The Power of Failing, which featured much louder and more energetic pieces. Tensions rose among the band during recording, and after recording was completed, the band split up. Simpson and Gomez formed The Gloria Record, while McCarver and Wiley formed Imbroco.

In 2017, Mineral accused rapper Gab3 and Lil Peep of plagiarism over an unlicensed and uncredited sample of the track "LoveLetterTypewriter" on their track "Hollywood Dreaming". Gab3 stated that the sample was meant to honor Mineral's work.

Track listing
 "Lovelettertypewriter" – 3:45
 "Palisade" – 4:31
 "Gjs" – 4:46
 "Unfinished" – 6:07
 "ForIvadell" – 3:36
 "Wakingtowinter" – 4:02
 "Aletter" – 4:53
 "Soundslikesunday" – 5:20
 "&serenading" – 5:24
 "Thelastwordisrejoice" – 5:09

References

External links

1998 albums
Mineral (band) albums